Mustafa Ismail (June 17, 1905 - December 26, 1978) was an Egyptian Quran reciter.

Early life
Ismail was born in a village called Mit Gazal, near Tanta in Egypt on 17 June 1905 and his parents named him Mustafa Muhammad Mursi Ismail. He was raised by his grandfather. Shaykh Mustafa Ismail focused on the Quran from an early age, when he reached the age of 10 he completed his hifdh Hafiz (memorized the Quran). He went to an Institution in Tanta and was instructed in the science of Tafsir (exegesis), Qiraa'at (art of recitation) and Fiqh (Islamic jurisprudence). After completing his formal studies, Sheikh Mustafa Ismail devoted his life to the service of the Quran.

Notable moments
His son Wahid Mustafa said:

Egyptian radio
The Qari who recited the Quran on Egypt radio became ill, Mustafa Ismail was given the opportunity to recite in his place. King Farouk of Egypt was listening in the audience.  King Farouk enjoyed Shaykh Mustafa Ismail's recitation so much that he requested Sheikh Mustafa Ismail to recite Quran during the Islamic month of Ramadan for himself. He was now the King's Qari.

By the 1940s he was recognized and respected by almost the whole of Egypt, one particular quality of note is that Sheikh Mustafa Ismail's personality never changed.

Sheikh Mustafa Ismail recites at a Special Programme to celebrate the birth of the Prophet Mohammed was organised by a non-profit organisation. The programme was to be broadcast on Egypt's national radio station Egypt and was scheduled to be on-air for 30 minutes. Sheikh Abdul Fattah Shashi was to recite the Quran, unfortunately he couldn't attend due to illness, the organisers tried to find another Qari as good as Sheikh Abdul Fattah Shashi.  The only Qari the organisers could find to recite in place of Sheikh Abdul Fattah Shashi was Sheikh Mustafa Ismail. Sheikh Mustafa Ismail was concerned of the 30 minute duration, Sheikh Mustafa Ismail was accustomed to recite for several hours at a time and now he would have to achieve the same quality recitation in only thirty minutes. In order to achieve this Sheikh Mustafa Ismail began practicing against the 30 minute limit. This marked a turning point in the life of Sheikh Mustafa Ismail of his life.

Visit to Turkey 1961 and 1969
Sheikh Mustafa Ismail arrived in Turkey in the year 1969, scheduled to stay in Ankara for 15 days, 15 days in Istanbul and then to visit the other major cities. Sheikh Mustafa Ismail wasn't very happy  with his initial reception, especially the number of people in the audience. He decided to shorten his stay in Ankara and he set off for Istanbul. When he arrived in Istanbul, Sheikh Mustafa Ismail was mesmerized. The President of Turkey invited him to the Royal Palace and gave a golden lettered Quran, as a special gift. Sheikh Mustafa Ismail stayed in Turkey for the whole month of Ramadhan. In this month he developed a special connection with Turkey, he said that he loved the people of Turkey. He also said "the people of Turkey are very respectful towards the Quran and they are very quiet and respectful during recitations." One member of the audience was Dr.Emin Isık from the University of Marmara. Dr. Emin Isık says "When we heard that he was going to recite in the Suleymaniye Mosque we rushed to listen to him. He recited the Quran for thirty minutes after the Taraweeh prayers. Unlike the people of Ankara, we had known Shaikh Mustafa Ismael very well. The mosque was completely full, Sheikh Mustafa Ismael said "I have travelled around the world but I have never seen anything like the audience of Istanbul."  He was very impressed and happy about the audiences love for the Quran and the beauty of the Mosque. According to his son Wahid, Shaykh Mustafa Ismael was delighted to be in Turkey. When they asked him "Would you recite Quran to us?" He never refused. Even when they asked him to recite Quran outside the Mosque, he never said no.

Style
Sheikh Mustafa Ismail had a unique style, he would recite the Quran in a particular fashion, employing the Arabic maqamat to illustrate the words of Allah to the listener.

Dr. Ahmed Nuaina, an Egyptian Qur'an reader, once told noted composer Ammar El-Shereii: 

The composer Abdel-Wahab was of much the same opinion: "He was big in his art, he was big in his management of his voice, and was the only reciter who surprised listeners with unexpected maqam routes," he once declared.

In his Dream TV program two years ago, El-Shereii tried to analyze the sheikh's musical approach by replaying a few short recitations. "His recitation was miraculous, and he was a musical miracle as well. He was unique."

Analyzing a different verse, the composer says:

Chronology
 1905 Mustafa Mohamed El-Mursi Ismail born on June 17 in Mit Ghazal, a Gharbeya governorate village.
 1911 The young Mostafa started learning the Qur'an in the kuttab of Sheikh Abdel Rahman Abul Einein
 1913 Mustafa moved to the kuttab of Sheikh Abdallah Shehata
 1915 The 10-year-old became a celebrity reciter in his village, as his voice started to draw listeners.
 1917 Ismail finished studying the art of tilawa and tajwid with Sheikh Idriss Fakher. He later moved to Tanta to study at the Religious Institute, after an Azhar sheikh heard him recite in Oteif mosque. The young Sheikh embarked on his career as a reciter.
 1920 He received 70 pt for his first official three-night aaza [mourning] event.
 1925 He recited during the aaza of one of Tanta's richest men, Hussein El-Qasabi, and soon became a celebrity all over rural Egypt.
 1927 He recited at the aaza of national leader Saad Zaghloul in Damietta. Meets his wife, the mother of his six children, and is also heard by all of Egypt's pashas. He has to open an office in Tanta to organize his schedule.
 1943 He recited in Cairo for the first time. He became a radio star.
 1944 He became King Farouk's favorite reciter. His famous recitations from the King's palace every Ramadan were heard by radio listeners all over the Arab world. Sheikh Mostafa travelled all over the Arab world.
 1947 He became Al-Azhar's reciter, a prestigious post.
 1965 Received the Distinction Medal from Gamal Abdel Nasser, who had also made him his official reciter. Umm Kulthum and Mohamed Abdel Wahab received their medals on the same night as Ismail.
 1977 Ismail travelled to Jerusalem with President Anwar Sadat.  He recited the Qur'an inside the Al-Aqsa mosque.
 1978 On 22 December, he recited the Qur'an for the last time in Damietta, dying on the 26th

References

External links
Mustafa_Ismail - mp3 audio & Videos
 http://www.quranreciters.com/wp/index.php/2006/04/23/mustafa-ismael-short-biography/
 http://www.egypttoday.com/article.aspx?ArticleID=5910

Egyptian Quran reciters
1905 births
1978 deaths